Karen Knútsdóttir (born 4 February 1990) is an Icelandic handballer who plays for Icelandic top division side Fram and the Icelandic national team as a middle back.

On April 26, 2018, Karen won her first national championship with Fram.

References

1990 births
Living people
Karen Knutsdottir
Karen Knutsdottir
Karen Knutsdottir
Karen Knutsdottir
Karen Knutsdottir
Fram women's handball players
21st-century Icelandic women